The list of New Zealand university leaders below shows the chancellors (ceremonial heads and chairs of university councils) and vice-chancellors (executive heads or chief executives) of New Zealand's eight universities.

Since the development of the university sector in New Zealand a small number of Vice-Chancellors (Principal, President, or Director) have served for 15 years or more with some portion of this time in office as Vice-Chancellor in New Zealand. They include:

31 years: Sir Geoffrey Peren KBE (Massey 1927–58) 

27 years: Robert Alexander (Lincoln 1908–35)

24 years: Sir Alan Stewart (educator) KBE (Massey 1959–83), Sir Colin Maiden (Auckland 1971–95)

22 years: Sir Malcolm Burns KBE (Lincoln 1952–74)

20 years: Sir Robert Aitken (Birmingham 1953-68, Otago 1948-53), Sir Robert Irvine (Otago 1973–93), James McWha AO (Lincoln 2018, Rwanda 2013–15, Adelaide 2002–12, Massey 1996–2001), Stuart McCutcheon (Auckland 2005–20, Victoria University of Wellington 2000–04)

18 years: John Chapman Andrew (UNZ 1887–1905)

17 years: Sir George Currie (academic) (UNZ 1952–62, Western Australia 1945–52), Jim Williams (Victoria University of Wellington 1951–68)

16 years: Eric Alexander (Lincoln 1908–35)

The current Chancellors and Vice-Chancellors are:

See also
Lists of university leaders

References

University leaders

New Zealand